Tirunelveli Junction railway station, also known as Nellai Junction railway station (station code TEN) serves the city of Tirunelveli in the Indian state of Tamil Nadu and is owned by the Madurai Railway division. The Nellai Express - a super-fast train connecting Tirunelveli and Chennai Egmore - runs packed almost throughout the year. Any train passing through the station halts at one of the five platforms, regardless of destination.

Tirunelveli Junction is one of the oldest and most popular stations on the Indian Railway network. It was built in 1893.

Railway lines

Suburban stations 
 Palayamkottai
 Melapalayam
 Pettai
 Tirunelveli Town
 Talayuthu
 Gangaikondan
 Cheranmahadevi

Junction Information
Type of Station: Junction

Number of Platforms: 5

Number of Halting Trains: 44

Number of Originating Trains: 25

Number of Terminating Trains: 25

Manimoortheeswaram
Manimoortheeswaram Uchishta Ganapathy Temple which is 900 years old, is situated at about 2 km from Tirunelveli Junction railway station.

Train List

56701 Punalur - Madurai Passenger. ...

56700 Madurai - Punalur Passenger

16688-Slip* Navyug Express Slip* ...

16861 Puducherry - Kanniyakumari Express. ...

16339 Mumbai CSMT - Nagercoil Express (Via. ...

16351 Mumbai CSMT - Nagercoil Balaji Express (Via. ...

22621 Rameswaram - Kanniyakumari SF Express (PT) ...

12633 Chennai Egmore - Kanniyakumari SF Express

12631 Chennai Egmore - Tirunelveli — Nellai Express

And many more...

References

http://www.thehindu.com/todays-paper/tp-national/tp-tamilnadu/surveillance-system-for-nellai-railway-junction/article2603211.ece

External links

Madurai railway division
Railway junction stations in Tamil Nadu
Transport in Tirunelveli
Railway stations in Tirunelveli district